Modrý kríž (Slovak for Blue Cross) was a "teetotalers' society" originating in Stará Turá, Slovakia at the end of the 19th century and the beginning of the 20th. It was founded by sisters Kristína Royová and Mária Royová and initiated a movement in the spiritual, cultural  and social life of the mainly peasant people of the surrounding region who traditionally belonged to the Lutheran Church. The sisters were also active as authors and in charitable work.

The society encouraged its members to become born-again Christians by means of everyday prayers and Bible study, while forbidding the consumption of alcohol, smoking, playing cards and dice, blasphemous speech, and obsessions of a sexual or other kind. After becoming member of the society, individuals are taught to read the bible intensively, listen to authorities in group and live their life according to subjective interpretation of bible explained by leaders (respected and self-presented as "experienced" holy people). Society helps its members to interrupt their unhealthy lifestyle with alcohol, passion for money and sexual enjoyment.

On the other hand, they act as sect in various ways, for example explain bible without sufficient knowledge according to rules in society and manage the lives of the members with massive manipulation similar to  Charismatic movement.  Leaders manipulate members to achieve their loyalty to leaders, presented as will of God. Furthermore, members advised to read the bible are forced to foresee the future according to their subjective feelings after random reading of bible on opened page.  Modrý kríž can be a benefit for an addicted person, but also dangerous in a negative psychological effect of inadequate controversial "sectarian" denomination practices on critical perception of reality and spiritual life of a member.

See also
Charismatic Movement
International Federation of the Blue Cross

References

 

Lutheran organizations
Religious organisations based in Slovakia
Temperance organizations
Alcohol in Slovakia